"We Are Beautiful" is a 2014 single by Panzer Flower, an electric/pop trio made up of Patrice Duthoo, Raphaël Glatz and Jean-Louis Palumbo. The song features vocals from Hubert Tubbs and was released by BIP Records and Happy Music.

Track list
Digital BIP Records
"We Are Beautiful" (radio edit) (3:42)
"We Are Beautiful" (original extended mix) (5:48)

Charts

Weekly charts

Year-end charts

References

2014 singles
2014 songs